Mount Maclayao a mountain in the Philippines. It is located in Mulanay, Quezon, in the Calabarzon region, north-west of the country, 200 km south-east of the national capital Manila.

References

Mountains of the Philippines
Landforms of Quezon